The following is a list of the monastic houses in Leicestershire, England.

See also
 List of monastic houses in England

Notes

References

Medieval sites in England
Leicestershire
Leicestershire
Lists of buildings and structures in Leicestershire